The 2004 International Formula 3000 season was the thirty-eight season of the second-tier of Formula One feeder championship and also twentieth and final season under the International Formula 3000 Championship moniker. It featured the 2004 FIA Formula 3000 International Championship, which was contested over ten rounds from 24 April to 11 September 2004.  Two titles were awarded, a Championship for Drivers and a Championship for Teams. This was the final FIA Formula 3000 International Championship before it was replaced by the GP2 Series in 2005.

Drivers and teams
The following drivers and teams contested the 2004 FIA Formula 3000 International Championship.

All entries used Lola B02/50 chassis with Zytek-Judd KV engines and Avon tyres.

Calendar

Drivers' Championship

 Points towards the 2004 FIA Formula 3000 International Championship for Drivers were awarded on a 10-8-6-5-4-3-2-1 basis for the first eight places at each round. The Sporting Regulations provided that if two or more drivers had the same number of points (including 0 points), their positions in the Championship was fixed according to the quality of their places. Under this system one first place was better than any number of second places, one second place was better than any number of third places, and so on.
All drivers used Lola B02/50 chassis with Zytek-Judd KV engines and Avon tyres.

Teams' Championship 

 Points towards the 2004 FIA Formula 3000 International Championship for Teams were awarded on a 10-8-6-5-4-3-2-1 basis for the first eight places at each round. The Sporting Regulations provided that if two or more teams had the same number of points (including 0 points), their positions in the Championship was fixed according to the quality of their places. Under this system one first place was better than any number of second places, one second place was better than any number of third places, and so on.

Complete Overview

R14=retired, but classified R=retired NS=did not start NT=no time set in qualifying

References

Further reading
 Automobile Year, 2004/05, pages 230-234 + 254

External links
 2004 F3000 International Championship entry list at www.speedsport-magazine.com
 Images from March 2004 Silverstone F3000 testing at www.motorsport.com

Formula 3000
International Formula 3000 seasons
Formula 3000